I Borghi più belli d'Italia is an association of small Italian towns of historical interest, that was founded in March 2001 on the initiative of the Tourism Council of the , with the aim of preserving and maintaining villages of quality heritage. The association holds initiatives such as festivals, exhibitions, fetes, conferences and concerts that highlight the cultural, historical, gastronomic and linguistic heritage, involving residents, schools, and local artists.

It was inspired by its older French counterpart, Les Plus Beaux Villages de France, and is part of the international organization "Les Plus Beaux Villages de la Terre". The admission of any village or town to the club requires of the same the meeting of a number of prerequisites, both structural—such as the architectonic harmony of the urban fabric and the quality of the public and private building heritage—and general, regarding the quality of life in the village itself, in terms of activities and services for the people.

Villages

Northern Italy

Aosta Valley (1)
Étroubles
Emilia-Romagna (13)
Bobbio
Brisighella
Castell'Arquato
Compiano
Dozza
Fiumalbo
Fontanellato
Gualtieri
Montefiore Conca
Montegridolfo
San Giovanni in Marignano
San Leo
Vigoleno
Friuli-Venezia Giulia (9)
Clauiano
Cordovado
Fagagna
Gradisca d'Isonzo
Poffabro
Polcenigo
Sesto al Reghena
Toppo
Valvasone Arzene
Liguria (21)
Apricale
Borgio Verezzi
Brugnato
Campo Ligure
Castelvecchio di Rocca Barbena
Cervo
Colletta di Castelbianco
Finalborgo
Framura
Laigueglia
Lingueglietta
Millesimo
Moneglia
Montemarcello
Noli
Seborga
Tellaro
Triora
Varese Ligure
Vernazza
Zuccarello
Lombardy (21)
Bienno
Cassinetta di Lugagnano
Castellaro Lagusello
Castelponzone
Cornello dei Tasso
Curiglia con Monteviasco
Fortunago
Gradella
Grazie
Gromo
Lovere
Monte Isola
Morimondo
Pomponesco
Porana
Sabbioneta
San Benedetto Po
Soncino
Tremezzina
Tremosine
Zavattarello
Piedmont (10)
Chianale
Garessio
Mombaldone
Neive
Orta San Giulio
Ostana
Ricetto di Candelo
Usseauso
Vogogna
Volpedo
Trentino-South Tyrol (8)
Canale di Tenno
Chiusa
Egna
Glorenza
Mezzano
Rango
San Lorenzo in Banale
Vipiteno
Veneto (6)
Arquà Petrarca
Asolo
Borghetto
Cison di Valmarino
Montagnana
Portobuffolé

Central Italy

Abruzzo (25)
Abbateggio
Anversa degli Abruzzi
Bugnara
Campli
Caramanico Terme
Casoli
Castel del Monte
Castelli
Città Sant'Angelo
Civitella del Tronto
Crecchio
Guardiagrele
Navelli
Opi
Pacentro
Penne
Pescocostanzo
Pettorano sul Gizio
Pietracamela
Pretoro
Rocca San Giovanni
Santo Stefano di Sessanio
Scanno
Tagliacozzo
Villalago
Lazio (13)
Boville Ernica
Campodimele
Caprarola
Castel di Tora
Castel Gandolfo
Castro dei Volsci
Civita di Bagnoregio
Collalto Sabino
Greccio
Monte San Giovanni Campano
Orvinio
San Donato Val di Comino
Sperlonga
Subiaco
Torre Alfina
Marche (22)
Cingoli
Corinaldo
Frontino
Gradara
Grottammare
Macerata Feltria
Matelica
Mondavio
Mondolfo
Monte Grimano
Montecassiano
Montecosaro
Montefabbri
Montefiore dell'Aso
Montelupone
Moresco
Offagna
Offida
San Ginesio
Sarnano
Treia
Visso
Molise (4)
Fornelli
Frosolone
Oratino
Sepino
Tuscany (19)
Anghiari
Barga
Buonconvento
Castelfranco Piandiscò
Castiglione di Garfagnana
Cetona
Coreglia Antelminelli
Giglio Castello
Loro Ciuffenna
Montemerano
Montescudaio
Pitigliano
Poppi
Porto Ercole
San Casciano dei Bagni
Santa Fiora
Scarperia San Piero
Sovana
Suvereto
Umbria (25)

Acquasparta
Arrone
Bettona
Bevagna
Borgo Sant'Antonio
Castiglione del Lago
Citerna
Corciano
Deruta
Giove
Lugnano in Teverina
Massa Martana
Monte Castello di Vibio
Montefalco
Montone
Norcia
Paciano
Panicale
Piediluco
San Gemini
Spello
Stroncone
Torgiano
Trevi
Vallo di Nera

Southern Italy

The villages in southern Italy and the islands are:
Apulia (10)
Alberona
Bovino
Cisternino
Locorotondo
Otranto
Pietramontecorvino
Presicce
Roseto Valfortore
Specchia
Vico del Gargano
Basilicata (6)
Acerenza
Castelmezzano
Guardia Perticara
Pietrapertosa
Venosa
Viggianello
Calabria (14)
Aieta
Altomonte
Bova
Buonvicino
Caccuri
Chianalea
Civita
Fiumefreddo Bruzio
Gerace
Morano Calabro
Oriolo
Rocca Imperiale
Santa Severina
Stilo
Tropea
Campania (10)
Albori
Atrani
Castellabate
Conca dei Marini
Furore
Monteverde
Nusco
Sant'Agata de' Goti
Savignano Irpino
Zungoli
Sardinia (8)
Atzara
Bosa
Carloforte
Castelsardo
La Maddalena
Lollove
Posada
Sadali
Sicily (18)
Castelmola
Castiglione di Sicilia
Castroreale
Cefalù
Erice
Ferla
Gangi
Geraci Siculo
Montalbano Elicona
Monterosso Almo
Novara di Sicilia
Palazzolo Acreide
Petralia Soprana
Sambuca di Sicilia
San Marco d'Alunzio
Savoca
Sperlinga
Sutera

See also 
 Bandiera arancione

Notes

References

Italian culture
Tourism in Italy
2001 establishments in Italy
Organizations established in 2001
Lists of most beautiful villages